Salmon Falls Dam is a dam constructed across Salmon Falls Creek in Twin Falls County, Idaho, in the United States.

The dam was built in 1910 to provide irrigation water storage, and is owned and operated by the Salmon River Canal Company. A secondary purpose is flood control: the dam has spilled floodwaters twice, in 1984 and 2017. Salmon Falls Creek Reservoir is also a popular recreational lake, and is considered one of the best fisheries in southern Idaho.

The dam was the third-largest dam in the world at the time of its construction. It was part of a major reclamation effort which partly failed due less water being available than planned, partly due to unexpected leakage of water through the lava rock used in the dam's construction.

The Milner Dam (1904) was more successful.

The Salmon Falls Tract, the associated reclamation project, was originally termed the Salmon River Tract, and the dam was named the Salmon Dam.  That naming "was chosen over Salmon Falls because the project promoters believed it had more appeal, although the dam’s name was changed back to Salmon Falls".

Historic site

The Salmon Falls Dam was listed on the National Register of Historic Places in 2009. The dam's engineer was Andrew J. Wiley. The historic listing includes the dam, one building, and seven other structures.

Gallery

See also
List of dams and reservoirs in Idaho

References

External links

Planning for Paradise: Idaho's Salmon Falls Dam (p. 4)

Dams in Idaho
Dams in the Columbia Basin
United States local public utility dams
Reservoirs in Idaho
Buildings and structures in Twin Falls County, Idaho
Dams completed in 1910
Arch-gravity dams
Lakes of Twin Falls County, Idaho
National Register of Historic Places in Twin Falls County, Idaho
Buildings and structures completed in 1908